Rawcliffe is a surname. Notable people with the surname include:

Derek Rawcliffe (1921–2011), English clergyman and writer
Gordon Rawcliffe (1910–1979), English electrical engineer and academic
Ian Rawcliffe, English-born president of the German Rugby Federation
Mary Rawcliffe, American soprano